Philip Eugene Batt (March 4, 1927 – March 4, 2023) was an American politician who served as the 29th Governor of Idaho from 1995 to 1999. A member of the Republican Party, Batt had previously served as the 35th Lieutenant Governor of Idaho, Chair of the Idaho Republican Party, and as a member of the Idaho Legislature.

Early life and education
Born in Wilder, Idaho, Batt was the fifth and youngest child of John and Elizabeth Karn Batt. He graduated from Wilder High School. Batt served sixteen months in the United States Army Air Forces during and after World War II at Lowry Field, Colorado, working as a clerk discharging veterans. He then returned to the University of Idaho and studied chemical engineering, lived in the dorms, and led a dance band, playing clarinet and tenor saxophone. (Half a century later as governor, Batt played with Lionel Hampton in Moscow, Idaho at the jazz legend's UI festival.)

Career

State offices
Before becoming governor, Batt had been a Republican politician in Idaho for thirty years, serving in the state legislature (house 1965–67, state senate 1967–79), and as the 35th lieutenant governor from 1979 to 1983. He ran for governor in 1982 and was defeated in a close race by the Democratic incumbent, John Evans. The election was so close that at least one television network declared Batt the winner on election night.

Batt returned to the state senate with victories in 1984 and 1986, then resigned in the spring of 1988 to sit on the three-member state transportation board, appointed by Governor Cecil Andrus.

Idaho Republican Party 
Batt was elected chairman of the Idaho Republican Party in January 1991, and after a successful two years, he stepped aside in April 1993 to re-enter electoral politics in 1994. Batt had previously run for the post in 1968 and lost to Roland Wilber, 127 to 218.

Governor
Batt won the Republican gubernatorial primary in 1994 with 48% of the vote, and defeated state attorney general Larry EchoHawk in the general election 52% to 44%, for the first GOP victory for governor in 28 years. Among Batt's more notable accomplishments as governor was pushing through worker's compensation for agricultural workers and negotiating a pact limiting nuclear waste storage in Idaho.

Later career 
Batt was one of Idaho's presidential electors for George W. Bush during the 2000 United States presidential election. Batt self-published two books after leaving office, a memoir titled The Compleat Phil Batt: A Kaleidoscope in 1999, and a compilation of humorous stories, Life as a Geezer, in 2003. Batt, who has a gay grandson who lives out of state, supported Add The Words.

Personal life 
On January 9, 1948, in Potlatch, Idaho, Batt eloped with Jacque Fallis of Spokane, a member of the Delta Delta Delta sorority. The newlyweds had to leave school a month later when Batt's 66-year-old father was involved in a serious automobile accident which left him with limited strength and speech. Though the young Batts initially hoped to return to college, economic circumstances changed their plans and they reluctantly did not.

Jacque Batt died on September 7, 2014, after 66 years of marriage. In 2015, at age 88, Batt married Francee Riley of Boise. Batt died on March 4, 2023, the morning of his 96th birthday.

Election history

References

External links
 Idaho Public Television: Phil Batt 
 The Almanac of American Politics: Phil Batt
 National Governors Association
 

|-

|-

|-

|-

|-

1927 births
2023 deaths
2000 United States presidential electors
20th-century American politicians
American people of English descent
Baptists from Idaho
Farmers from Idaho
Lieutenant Governors of Idaho
Military personnel from Idaho
People from Wilder, Idaho
Republican Party governors of Idaho
Republican Party Idaho state senators
Republican Party members of the Idaho House of Representatives
United States Army Air Forces personnel of World War II
United States Army Air Forces soldiers
Place of death missing